Playas is a census-designated place (CDP) in Hidalgo County, New Mexico, United States. As of the 2010 census it had a population of 74.

History

It is a former company town, named after a nearby former settlement along the Southern Pacific Railroad. Over 270 rental homes, six apartment buildings, a post office, grocery/dry goods store (Phelps Dodge Mercantile), medical clinic with heliport, a bowling alley ("Copper Pins"), grill, a rodeo arena, horse stables, a fitness center, a shooting range, an airstrip and a swimming pool were built for the community, which even has its own ZIP Code (88009). At its peak, the town had about 1,100 residents and included two churches built on land leased from the mining company.

The smelter, which included state of the art environmental controls, a power plant and sulfuric acid plants, was closed by the company as part of a move towards new processing technologies for processing copper concentrates. Declining copper prices accelerated the closure in 1999; all of its residents were required to leave within a year, though a skeleton crew of about a dozen employees remained in the area.

Four years later, New Mexico Tech agreed to purchase the town and the surrounding  for $5 million, using Department of Homeland Security funds secured by Senator Pete Domenici. The town is now a training and research facility (the Playas Training and Research Center, operated by New Mexico Tech's EMRTC) for the university's first responders, counter-terrorism, and Air Force programs, supported by tens of millions of dollars in federal funds.

Geography
Playas is located in eastern Hidalgo County and is bordered to the east by Grant County. It sits at the northwestern base of the Little Hatchet Mountains, on the east side of the Playas Valley.

Demographics

See also

 List of census-designated places in New Mexico

References

External links

 Playas Training and Research Center
 Animas, Cotton City, and Playas 
 Isolated desert town is ready to become a target from the International Herald Tribune
 Playas Purchase Boosts Homeland Security
 New Mexico Tech Board of Regents Approves Purchase of Playas
 Photographic and site description at CLUI
 Playas contextualized in "Cities Under Siege" by Stephen Graham

Pete Domenici press releases
 N.M. Tech Focus on Security Research Creates Educational, Economic Opportunities
 Domenici secures $80 million in additional funds to support national security work carried out in New Mexico

Census-designated places in New Mexico
Company towns in New Mexico
Mining communities in New Mexico
United States Department of Homeland Security
Census-designated places in Hidalgo County, New Mexico
History of Hidalgo County, New Mexico
Populated places established in the 1970s
Phelps Dodge